Samar Khizan (also Romanized as S̄amar Khīzān; also known as S̄amar Khazān) is a village in Shebli Rural District, in the Central District of Bostanabad County, East Azerbaijan Province, Iran. At the 2006 census, its population was 135, in 23 families.

References 

Populated places in Bostanabad County